Cregg is a surname of Irish origin. People with the name include:

C. J. Cregg, a fictional character in TV series The West Wing
Cathal Cregg, Irish Gaelic footballer
Huey Lewis, American musician (birth name Hugh Anthony Cregg III)
James Cregg, American football coach
Patrick Cregg, Irish footballer

See also 
Cregg, County Londonderry, a townland in County Londonderry, Northern Ireland
Cregg River, a river in County Galway, Ireland
Cregg Mill, County Galway, a mill on the Cregg River
Creggs, a small village in County Galway
Lindborg-Cregg Field, a baseball stadium in Montana, USA
North Cregg, Irish traditional music band

Surnames
Surnames of Irish origin